The U.S. state of North Carolina first required its residents to register their motor vehicles in 1907. Registrants provided their own license plates for display until 1913, when the state began to issue plates.

, plates are issued by the North Carolina Department of Transportation (NCDOT) through its Division of Motor Vehicles. Only rear plates have been required since 1956.

Passenger baseplates

1913 to 1974
The 1955 (dated 1956) issue was the first North Carolina license plate that complied with these standards.

1975 to present

Non-passenger plates

Temporary plates

References

Further reading
North Carolina license plates, 1969–present
Gallery of North Carolina License Plates, 1913-present (by Rick Kretschmer)

External links

North Carolina
North Carolina transportation-related lists
Transportation in North Carolina